Aleksandra Stokłosa (born 16 April 1999) is a Polish handballer who plays for Start Elbląg.

Achievements
Ekstraklasa:
Bronze Medalist: 2017

International career
In 2016, Stokłosa was named in Leszek Krowicki's preliminary squad for the 2016 European Championship.

References

1999 births
Living people
Sportspeople from Tarnów
Polish female handball players
Expatriate handball players
Polish expatriate sportspeople in Romania
21st-century Polish women